Stenelmis gammoni is a species of beetles in the riffle beetle family, Elmidae. It is known by the common name Gammon's riffle beetle.

The beetle is native to the United States. It was first described from the New River in North Carolina in 1976. Its total distribution is still unclear, but it has been found in Virginia and Alabama as well.

Each elytron has two spots.

References

Beetles described in 1976
Insects of the United States
Byrrhoidea
Taxonomy articles created by Polbot